Katarina may refer to:

Geography
Katarina-Sofia borough, a borough in central Stockholm
Topol pri Medvodah, a settlement in the Municipality of Medvode, Slovenia, known as Katarina

People
Katarina (given name)
Katarina (Doctor Who), a character in the television series, Doctor Who

Other uses
Katarina Church, a church building in Stockholm, Sweden
Katarina Elevator, an elevator in Stockholm, Sweden
Katharina (chiton), a genus of chitons
MV Katarina, a restaurant ship and former steam ship in Turku, Finland

See also
Katariina, a district in Turku, Finland
Catherina, and similar spellings